Viktoriya Pastarnak (born 31 August 1997) is a Kazakhstani professional racing cyclist who rides for Astana Women's Team.

See also
 List of 2016 UCI Women's Teams and riders

References

External links
 

1997 births
Living people
Kazakhstani female cyclists
Place of birth missing (living people)
20th-century Kazakhstani women
21st-century Kazakhstani women